The South Auckland Rugby Union was a governing body for Rugby Union in the area south of Auckland and north of Waikato from 1926 until 1955.

History
The South Auckland union (the second union by that name) was founded in 1926 by amalgamating several clubs and sub-unions in the South Auckland area which had been affiliated with the Auckland Rugby Union to that stage. It lasted until 1955 when it became a full union and was renamed as "South Auckland Counties", later as the Counties Rugby Football Union (shortened to "Counties") in 1956.

References

Defunct New Zealand rugby union governing bodies
Rugby union in the Auckland Region
Sports organizations established in 1909
1909 establishments in New Zealand
1921 disestablishments in New Zealand